São Simão is a municipality in the state of São Paulo in Brazil. The population is 15,385 (2020 est.) in an area of 617 km². The elevation is 665 m.

References

Municipalities in São Paulo (state)